Ulrike is a Germanic female given name. Notable people named Ulrike include:

 Princess Ulrike Friederike Wilhelmine of Hesse-Kassel (1722–1787), German noble
 Ulrike von Levetzow (1804–1899), German noble and friend of Johann Wolfgang von Goethe 
 Ulrike Louise of Solms-Braunfels (1731–1792), German noble 
 Ulrike Adeberg (born 1970), German speed skater 
 Ulrike Arnold (born 1950), German artist
 Ulrike Bahr (born 1964), German politician
 Ulrike Baumgartner (born 1974), Austrian former cyclist
 Ulrike Beisiegel (born 1952), German biochemist
 Ulrike Bruns (born 1953), German track and field athlete 
 Ulrike Denk (born 1964), German sprint hurdler
 Ulrike Deppe (born 1953), German slalom canoeist 
 Ulrike Diebold (born 1961), Austrian physicist and educator
 Ulrike Draesner (born 1962), German author
 Ulrike Felt (born 1957), Austrian social scientist
 Ulrike Fitzer, née Flender (born 1982), German Air Force pilot
 Ulrike Folkerts (born 1961), German actress
 Ulrike Frank (born 1969), German actress 
 Ulrike Goldmann (born 1980), German singer (from the group Blutengel)
 Ulrike Gräßler (born 1987), German ski jumper
 Ulrike Grossarth (born 1952), German artist, dancer and academic
 Ulrike Guérot (born 1964), German political scientist
 Ulrike Haage (born 1957), German pianist and composer
 Ulrike Henschke (1830–1897), German pioneer of women's education
 Ulrike Holmer (born 1967), German sports shooter
 Ulrike Holzner (born 1968), German bobsledder 
 Ulrike Jurk (born 1979), German volleyball player
 Ulrike Klees (born 1955), German swimmer
 Ulrike Kleindl (born 1963), Austrian long-jumper
 Ulrike Klotz (born 1970), German gymnast 
 Ulrike Koch (born 1950), German sinologist and filmmaker
 Ulrike Krumbiegel (born 1961), German actress
 Ulrike Liedtke (born 1958), German musicologist and politician
 Ulrike Lunacek (born 1957), Austrian politician
 Ulrike Mai (born 1960), German actress
 Ulrike Maisch (born 1977), German long-distance runner 
 Ulrike Malmendier (born 1973), German economist and professor
 Ulrike Mathesius (born 19??), German plant microbiologist
 Ulrike Meinhof (1934–1976), German left-wing militant and co-founder of the Red Army Faction
 Ulrike Meyfarth (born 1956), German high jumper
 Ulrike Müller (politician) (born 1962), German politician
 Ulrike Müller (artist) (born 1971), Austrian visual artist
 Ulrike Müßig (born 1968), German jurist and legal historian 
 Ulrike Ottinger (born 1942), German filmmaker, documentarian photographer and professor
 Ulrike Poppe (born 1953), German politician
 Ulrike Reinhard (born 1960), German publisher and author
 Ulrike Richter (born 1959), German swimmer
 Ulrike Rodust (born 1949), German politician
 Ulrike Rosenbach (born 1943), German video artist 
 Ulrike Sarvari (born 1964), German sprinter
 Ulrike Schmetz (born 1979), German footballer 
 Ulrike Schwerdtner (born 1973), German volleyball player
 Ulrike Sennewald (born 1989), German rower
 Ulrike Stange (born 1984), German handballer
 Ulrike Stanggassinger (born 1968), German alpine skier 
 Ulrike Tauber (born 1958), German swimmer
 Ulrike Theusner (born 1982), German artist
 Ulrike Tillmann (born 1962), German mathematician 
 Ulrike Urbansky (born 1977), German track and field athlete 
 Ulrike Weichelt (born 1977), German cyclist
 Ulrike Werner (born 19??), Austrian slalom canoeist
 Ulrike Winter (born 1940), Australian fencer

See also
 Ulrikke, people known by the given name
 Ulrica / Ulrika, people known by the given name

References

German feminine given names